The Campaign Against Home and Water Taxes (CAHWT) was a group opposed to the introduction of property and water taxes in the Republic of Ireland. It called for the boycott to be used to this effect.

The campaign launched on 22 December 2011. It had a national presence, and was supported by numerous national representatives, including Joe Higgins, Clare Daly, Joan Collins, Séamus Healy, Richard Boyd Barrett and Thomas Pringle. It also had support from some Sinn Féin members and the Socialist Party. It was not supported by Fianna Fáil. Fine Gael Environment Minister Phil Hogan, who was charged with implementing the taxes, openly criticised the campaign.

It established a "national anti-household tax" phone line and organised meetings in every major town in the country. The Irish Times said in April 2012 that the campaign had been "built with lightning speed."

On 1 May 2013, Gardaí arrested five members of the group, including Ted Tynan and Mick Barry, during a midday protest inside the Patrick Street branch of the Bank of Ireland in Cork city. Tynan said he felt a need to stand up against austerity.

On 6 May 2013, the Revenue Commissioners reported that 1.2 m households (74%) have paid the property tax. In August 2013, the Revenue said 1.58 m households had paid the tax, and over €175 m has been collected.

References

2011 establishments in Ireland
2014 disestablishments in Ireland
Post-2008 Irish economic downturn
 
Protests in the Republic of Ireland
Political advocacy groups in the Republic of Ireland